Johnny Thio (2 September 1944 in Roeselare – 4 August 2008 in Hooglede) was a Belgian footballer.

During his career he played for Club Brugge K.V. He earned 18 caps for the Belgium national football team, and participated in UEFA Euro 1972.

Honours

Player 

 Club Brugge

 Belgian First Division: 1972–73
 Belgian Cup: 1967–68, 1969–70
 Jules Pappaert Cup: 1972

International

Belgium 

 UEFA Euro 1972: Third place

References

1944 births
2008 deaths
People from Roeselare
Belgian footballers
Belgium international footballers
UEFA Euro 1972 players
Belgian Pro League players
Club Brugge KV players
Association football midfielders
Footballers from West Flanders